Herman Terrado (born September 27, 1989) is a professional mixed martial artist from Guam currently competing in the Welterweight division. A professional competitor since 2008, Terrado has also formerly competed for Strikeforce and the Professional Fighters League.

Background
Born and raised on the island of Guam, Terrado began bodybuilding at the age of 11 and was talented, going on to win several competitions. In high school, Terrado competed in wrestling and also excelled, winning gold medals for his junior and senior seasons. It was after graduating high school that Terrado began training in MMA.

Mixed martial arts career

Early career
Terrado made his professional MMA debut on March 8, 2008, when he faced Bobby Green at COF 11: No Mercy. He lost the fight via guillotine choke submission. Terrado fought in many promotions throughout the United States, most notably Gladiator Challenge, where he held a record of 3–0.

Terrado would compile a professional MMA record of 7–2 on the regional circuit before signing with now-defunct promotion Strikeforce in early 2008.

Strikeforce
Terrado made his debut against A.J. Matthews on April 9, 2011 at Strikeforce: Diaz vs. Daley. He won via TKO (punches) in the first round.

Terrado faced Chris Brown on December 17, 2011 at Strikeforce: Melendez vs. Masvidal. He won via submission due to an armbar in the third round.

Bellator MMA
Terrado was expected to face Mark Scanlon on September 20, 2013 at Bellator 100 in the quarterfinal match of Bellator Season Nine Welterweight Tournament. However, Scanlon was replaced by Rick Hawn due to injury. Terrado lost via unanimous decision (30-27, 29-28, 29-28).

Terrado then faced Justin Baesman at Bellator 115 on April 4, 2014. After three back-and-forth rounds, the fight was ruled a majority draw. Following the event, Terrado tested positive for Drostanolone Metabolites. Terrado was given a nine-month suspension by The Nevada State Athletic Commission and fined $1,000.

Professional Fighters League
After going 3-0 on the California regional scene, in June 2017, Terrado debuted for the Professional Fighters League, the recently renamed World Series of Fighting. He faced João Zeferino at Professional Fighters League 36: Fitch vs. Foster and won the back-and-forth fight by split decision.

Terrado faced Magomed Magomedkerimov at PFL 3, getting chocked out at the end of the first round via rear-naked choke.

On August 16, 2018, Terrado faced Jake Shields at PFL 6, losing via unanimous decision advancing to the playoffs.

Bellator MMA

Terrado was expected to face Mukhamed Berkhamov on April 2, 2021 at Bellator 255. Berkhamov missed weight by 2.8 pounds, leading to the boutbeing pulled from the lineup due to Berkhamov’s miss.

Mixed martial arts record

|-
|Loss
|align=center|15–5–1
|Jake Shields
|Decision (unanimous)
|PFL 6 
|
|align=center|3
|align=center|5:00
|Atlantic City, New Jersey, United States
|  
|-
|Loss
|align=center|15–4–1
|Magomed Magomedkerimov
|Technical Submission (rear-naked choke)
|PFL 3 
|
|align=center|1
|align=center|4:54
|Washington, D.C., United States
|  
|-
| Win
| align=center|15–3–1
| João Zeferino
| Decision (split)
| PFL: Daytona
| 
| align=center| 3
| align=center| 5:00
| Daytona Beach, Florida, United States
|
|-
|Win
|align=center|14–3–1
|Roman Bellow
|Submission (front choke)
|Gladiator Challenge: MMA Smackdown
|
|align=center|1
|align=center|1:26
|El Cajon, California, United States
|
|-
|Win
|align=center|13–3–1
|CJ Bains
|TKO (punches)
|Gladiator Challenge: Contenders
|
|align=center|1
|align=center|0:07
|El Cajon, California, United States
|
|-
|Win
|align=center|12–3–1
|Chris Navas
|Submission (rear-naked choke)
|Gladiator Challenge: Warrior's
|
|align=center|1
|align=center|0:49
|El Cajon, California, United States
|
|-
|Draw
|align=center|11–3–1
|Justin Baesman
|Draw (majority)
|Bellator 115
|
|align=center|3
|align=center|5:00
|Reno, Nevada, United States
|Terrado tested positive for Drostanolone Metabolites post-fight.
|-
|Loss
|align=center|11–3
|Rick Hawn
|Decision (unanimous)
|Bellator 100
|
|align=center|3
|align=center|5:00
|Phoenix, Arizona, United States
|
|-
|Win
|align=center|11–2
|Jordan Delano
|TKO (punches)
|Xplode Fight Series: Devastation
|
|align=center|1
|align=center|0:26
|Valley Center, California, United States
|
|-
|Win
|align=center|10–2
|Joey Apodaca
|TKO (punches)
|Xplode Fight Series: Revancha
|
|align=center|1
|align=center|0:15
|Valley Center, California, United States
|
|-
|Win
|align=center|9–2
|Chris Brown
|Submission (armbar)
|Strikeforce: Melendez vs. Masvidal
|
|align=center|3
|align=center|4:05
|San Diego, California, United States
|
|-
|Win
|align=center|8–2
|A.J. Matthews
|KO (punch)
|Strikeforce: Diaz vs. Daley
|
|align=center|1
|align=center|4:16
|San Diego, California, United States
|
|-
|Win
|align=center|7–2
|Roscoe Jackson
|TKO (punches)
|Desert Rage Full Contact Fighting 6
|
|align=center|1
|align=center|1:58
|Yuma, Arizona, United States
|
|-
|Win
|align=center|6–2
|Gabriel Godly
|Submission (rear-naked choke)
|Gladiator Challenge: High Impact
|
|align=center|1
|align=center|2:11
|Pauma Valley, California, United States
|
|-
|Win
|align=center|5–2
|Daniel Fair
|Submission (triangle choke)
|Gladiator Challenge: Venom
|
|align=center|1
|align=center|N/A
|Pauma Valley, California, United States
|
|-
|Loss
|align=center|4–2
|Marcio Navarro
|Decision (unanimous)
|Slammin Jammin Weekend 2
|
|align=center|3
|align=center|5:00
|Red Rock, Oklahoma, United States
|
|-
|Win
|align=center|4–1
|Shawn Sherril
|TKO (punches)
|Gladiator Challenge: Warriors
|
|align=center|1
|align=center|0:39
|Pauma Valley, California, United States
|
|-
|Win
|align=center|3–1
|Jeff Welsing
|KO (punch)
|Desert Rage Full Contact Fighting 4
|
|align=center|1
|align=center|4:13
|Yuma, Arizona, United States
|
|-
|Win
|align=center|2–1
|John Mercurio
|TKO (elbows)
|Total Combat 32
|
|align=center|2
|align=center|2:31
|El Cajon, California, United States
|
|-
|Win
|align=center|1–1
|Justin Ross
|Submission (armbar)
|COF 12: Nightmare
|
|align=center|1
|align=center|1:35
|Tijuana, Baja California, Mexico
|
|-
|Loss
|align=center|0–1
|Bobby Green
|Submission (guillotine choke)
|COF 11: No Mercy
|
|align=center|3
|align=center|1:28
|Tijuana, Baja California, Mexico
|

See also
 List of current Bellator fighters

References

1989 births
Living people
Guamanian male mixed martial artists
Welterweight mixed martial artists
Mixed martial artists utilizing wrestling
People from Barrigada